Protaleuron is a genus of moths in the family Sphingidae.

Species
Protaleuron herbini Haxaire, 2001
Protaleuron rhodogaster Rothschild & Jordan 1903

Dilophonotini
Moth genera
Taxa named by Walter Rothschild
Taxa named by Karl Jordan